Earl Hubert Thomas (September 22, 1915 – October 7, 1989) was an American professional basketball player. He played in the National Basketball League for the Cincinnati Comellos in 1937–38, then for the Indianapolis Kautskys in 1938–39. In nine career games he averaged 1.0 point per game. In his post-basketball life Thomas worked as a regional sales manager for a publishing company.

References

1915 births
1989 deaths
American men's basketball players
Basketball players from Ohio
Centers (basketball)
Cincinnati Comellos players
Indianapolis Kautskys players
Ohio State Buckeyes men's basketball players
People from Ashland, Ohio